Tian Kong (天空), known as Sky in the English-speaking world, is the ninth studio album (her second album in Mandarin) recorded by Chinese singer Faye Wong when she was based in Hong Kong. It was released on 10 November 1994.

Track listing

"Angel" was the ending theme music for Mermaid Got Married and was also featured in an episode of Princess Angel.

"Elude" is a Mandarin version of Wong's Cantonese song "Dream Person", which was included on Random Thoughts and featured in Chungking Express. The song is a cover of The Cranberries' "Dreams". Both versions are still played frequently in Chinese media.

Release history

References

1994 albums
Faye Wong albums
Cinepoly Records albums
Sony Music albums
Mandopop albums